Phyllonorycter harrisella is a moth of the family Gracillariidae. It is found in all of Europe, except the Balkan Peninsula and the Mediterranean islands.

The wingspan is 7–9 mm. The forewings are shining white; three posterior costal and two dorsal dark fuscous strigulae, anteriorly more or less margined suffusedly with brownish-ochreous, apex brownish-ochreous, enclosing a round black apical dot; an ill-defined dark hook in apical cilia. Hindwings are light grey.

Adults are on wing in May and June and again in autumn.

The larvae feed on Quercus cerris, Quercus cerris austriaca, Quercus dalechampii, Quercus faginea, Quercus frainetto, Quercus macranthera, Quercus petraea, Quercus pontica, Quercus pubescens and Quercus robur. They mine the leaves of their host plant. They create a small, lower-surface tentiform mine with one strong fold in the lower epidermis. The pupa is made in a tough white cocoon that is attached to both the floor and the roof of the mine.

References

External links
 Plant Parasites of Europe
 Fauna Europaea
 

harrisella
Moths described in 1761
Moths of Europe
Taxa named by Carl Linnaeus